Jeremy Dutcher is a classically-trained Canadian Indigenous tenor, composer, musicologist, performer and activist, who previously lived in Toronto, Ontario and currently lives in Montréal, Québec. He became widely known for his first album Wolastoqiyik Lintuwakonawa, which won the 2018 Polaris Music Prize and the Juno Award for Indigenous Music Album of the Year at the 2019 Juno Awards.

A Wolastoqiyik (Maliseet) member of the Tobique First Nation in North-West New Brunswick, Dutcher studied music and anthropology at Dalhousie University. After training as an operatic tenor in the Western classical tradition, he expanded his professional repertoire to include the traditional singing style and songs of his community.

He recorded Wolastoqiyik Lintuwakonawa following a research project on archival recordings of traditional Maliseet songs at the Canadian Museum of History, many of which are no longer being passed down to contemporary Maliseet youth.

He is set to appear as a guest judge in an upcoming episode of the third season of Canada's Drag Race, airing in summer 2022.

Dutcher identifies as two-spirit, a modern, pan-Indian, umbrella term used by some Indigenous North Americans to describe aboriginal people fulfilling a traditional third-gender (or other gender-variant) ceremonial cultural role in their community.

Discography 
 Wolastoqiyik Lintuwakonawa (2018)

Awards and nominations

Activism

Indigenous activism 
Dutcher aims to preserve both Wolastoq culture and language through his music, and inspire Indigenous youth to think about the importance of language. When asked about his decision to record in his native Wolastoq language, Dutcher stated "it’s less about asking people to learn a new language and more about disrupting the bilingual Anglo-centric Canadian music narrative. Up until this point, why have there been no popular records in my language?"

At the Juno Awards pre-telecast industry gala dinner on March 16, 2019, Dutcher used his acceptance speech to critique the Trudeau government's approach to reconciliation with indigenous peoples. Although his remarks were interrupted partway through when he was played off the stage, later that evening Arkells gave their own speaking time to allow him to conclude his remarks. He made his first national televised performance at the Juno Awards the following night, March 17, 2019, performing “Sakomawit” from his album Wolastoqiyik Lintuwakonawa beneath black and white photographs of his Wolastoq ancestors.

LGBTQ+ activism 
Dutcher was previously responsible for development coordination and Indigenous outreach at Egale Canada, which is currently the country's only national LGBT human rights organization.

The intersection of identifying as both Indigenous and Two-Spirited allows Dutcher to speak out on the Indigenization of queer spaces. In the Two-Spirit Roundtable project he speaks on the lack of gendered pronouns in the Maliseet language, and advocates for a "less western" way of thinking about gender.

References

1990 births
21st-century Canadian pianists
21st-century Canadian male opera singers
Canadian contemporary classical composers
Canadian male pianists
Canadian musicologists
Dalhousie University alumni
First Nations musicians
Juno Award for Indigenous Music Album of the Year winners
LGBT classical composers
LGBT First Nations people
Canadian LGBT singers
Living people
Maliseet people
Musicians from Fredericton
Musicians from Toronto
Polaris Music Prize winners
Two-spirit people
21st-century Canadian LGBT people